Sasha Gordon Lakovic (September 7, 1971 – April 25, 2017) was a Canadian professional ice hockey player who played for 17 different professional teams during his career. Lakovic also played for four roller hockey teams in the mid-1990s.

Lakovic also had a stint in acting, landing a small role as Russian ice hockey player Boris Mikhailov in the 2004 Disney biopic Miracle.

His nicknames were Hitman, Pitbull and Sasha the Basha.

Playing career
Lakovic turned pro in 1992–93, playing for three separate Colonial Hockey League teams, as well as the American Hockey League's Binghamton Rangers.  Lakovic bounced around the ECHL, Central Hockey League, International Hockey League and AHL for a few more seasons, including an incident where he got on all fours and barked to the crowd after defeating Barry Potomski in a fight while with the IHL's Las Vegas Thunder. Lakovic moved on to the National Hockey League's Calgary Flames in 1996–97. and was dealt to the New Jersey Devils a year later. Lakovic would play only 37 NHL games before finishing his career with stops in the West Coast Hockey League, and finally the Ligue Nord-Américaine de Hockey before retiring following the 2004–05 season.

Lakovic became known as an enforcer, registering 397 penalty minutes in his first pro season. He peaked at 416 penalty minutes in just 49 games in 1996–97 as a member of the Las Vegas Thunder.

During the hockey off-season, Lakovic played roller hockey for three Roller Hockey International teams from 1993–97, and in the Major League Roller Hockey in 1998.

Battle of Alberta
Lakovic gained widespread attention on November 23, 1996 when playing in his first, and only, Battle of Alberta game between the Flames and the Edmonton Oilers. Late in the game, played at Northlands Coliseum in Edmonton, a drunken fan reached over the glass, dumping his drink on the head of Flames assistant coach Guy Lapointe. Lakovic immediately jumped over the glass attempting to get at the fan. Held back from climbing over by his teammates, Lakovic was suspended two games for the incident.

Post-NHL
Lakovic later played in the American Hockey League, West Coast Hockey League, Quebec Semi-Pro Hockey League (now as Ligue Nord-Américaine de Hockey) and left hockey after 2005. He lived his later years in West Kelowna, British Columbia.

Acting
He portrayed Boris Mikhailov, captain of the Soviet hockey team at the 1980 Winter Olympics, in the movie Miracle based on the Miracle on Ice.

Death
On October 12, 2016, Lakovic publicly announced that he was diagnosed with inoperable brain cancer and was given only three months to live.

Lakovic died on April 25, 2017 at the age of 45.

Personal life
Lakovic was born into a Montenegrin Serb family to parents Spasoje and Marsha, who emigrated from Podgorica. He had four children and three brothers named Veso Greg, Zoran, and Milosh.

Career statistics

Regular season and playoffs

See also
 List of violent spectator incidents in sports

Notes

References

External links
 

1971 births
2017 deaths
Albany River Rats players
Anchorage Aces players
Bakersfield Condors (1998–2015) players
Bellingham Ice Hawks players
Binghamton Rangers players
Brantford Smoke players
Calgary Flames players
Canadian ice hockey right wingers
Canadian people of Serbian descent
Canadian people of Montenegrin descent
Chatham Wheels players
Columbus Chill players
Kelowna Spartans players
Las Vegas Thunder players
Long Beach Ice Dogs (WCHL) players
New Jersey Devils players
Oakland Skates players
Rochester Americans players
Saint John Flames players
San Jose Rhinos players
Ice hockey people from Vancouver
Toledo Storm players
Tulsa Oilers (1992–present) players
Undrafted National Hockey League players
Vancouver VooDoo players